Edward Strong the Elder (1652–1724) and Edward Strong the Younger (1676–1741) were a father and son pair of British sculptors mainly working in London in the 17th and 18th centuries. They led a team of 65 masons and were responsible for many important projects including the rebuilding of St Paul's Cathedral and Blenheim Palace.

Life

Edward came from a long line of masons and quarry owners and was the son of Valentine Strong (1609-1662) and Anne Margetts. Valentine had built Sherborne House for Sir John Dutton 1651 to 1653. His grandfather Timothy Strong rebuilt the frontage of Cornbury House in 1631. His elder brother Thomas Strong was also a mason but died young in 1681.

In 1680 he became a full guild member of the Masons Company of London. London was still in the aftermath of the Great Fire and many major rebuilding projects were planned. Strong formed a business relationship with Christopher Wren around 1680 with their first joint project being St Benet's, Paul's Wharf one of the many churches destroyed in the fire. There most important joint project was St Paul's which is nor only the magnum opus of Wren but also of Strong. Strong oversaw the bulk of the ornamentation including the frontage and the dome.

Wren and Strong appear to have been friends over and beyond their long-standing business connection, and the relationship was certainly mutually beneficial. Their sons were particularly close (see below). It is likely that they spent much private time together discussing the practicalities and design options of various design features.

He died on 8 February 1724 and was buried in the Church of St Peter, St. Albans. His monument has a bust and is probably by this son.

.

Known Works

St Paul's Cathedral (1680-1697)
St. Benet's, Paul's Wharf (1680)
St Austin-by-St. Paul's (1680)
St. Mildred's Church (1677-1683)
New classical frontage at Winchester Palace (1682-1686)
St Mary Magdalen Old Fish Street (1683-1687)
St Clement, Eastcheap (1683-1687)
St Michael Paternoster Royal (1685-1694)
Chimneypiece for the Queen's Withdrawing Room at the Palace of Whitehall (1688)
Remodelling of Greenwich Palace (1698)
Blenheim Palace (1705-1712)
Sundial at Inner Temple Gardens (1707)
Cannons for the Duke of Chandos (1715)

Edward Strong the Younger

Edward was the son of Edward Strong the Elder and Martha Beauchamp, sister of the sculptor Ephraim Beauchamp.

He trained under his father and became a full member of the Guild of Masons in 1698. In the same year he went on an architectural tour of Europe, visiting France, Italy and Holland with Christopher Wren the Younger. This year long trip indicates a friendship beyond a simple working relationship. It is also noteworthy that this trip is somewhat early within the British fashion for the "Grand Tour" which was at its peak 50 years later.

He worked on many projects with his father including St Paul's Cathedral, Greenwich and Blenheim Palace and is specifically noted (on his own account) as mason of the lantern on the dome of St Pauls.

He was involved with multiple "Wren spires".

He died on 10 October 1741.

Known Works

Spire on St Vedast Foster Lane (1695-1698)
Spire on St Stephen Walbrook (c.1696)
Lantern on St Paul's Cathedral (1706)
Marlborough House (1708-1711)
Chapter House, St Paul's Cathedral (1712)
St Alphege Greenwich (1712-1714)
St Anne Limehouse (1712-1724)
St Paul Deptford (1712-1730)
St. John's, Westminster (1714-1728)
Spire on St James Garlickhithe (1715-1717)
St George Wapping (1715-1723)
West colonnade of Greenwich Palace (1719)
Tower of St Michael Cornhill (1715-1721)
Tower of St Christopher Threadneedle Street (c.1720)
Lantern on Christ Church Greyfriars (c.1720)
Dr Draper's house in Surrey

Family
Edward the Younger married Susanna Roberts in 1699 and they had four daughters. The eldest Susannah Strong, married Sir John Strange and had eleven children including John Strange.

Artistic Recognition

Edward the Elder was portrayed by Godfrey Kneller around 1690. The portrait is held by the Museum of Freemasonry.

References
 

1652 births
1724 deaths
Freemasons
British sculptors
17th-century works